Elif Jale Yeşilırmak, née Yulia Guramievna Rekvava, (born July 30, 1986 in Smolensk, Russia) is a former Russian-Turkish female wrestler. She is the first woman wrestler to represent Turkey at the Olympics. She is a member of Trakya Birlikspor.

Born on July 30, 1986 in Russia, Yulia Rekvava won the bronze medal for her native country in the 59 kg division at the 2009 European Wrestling Championships held in Vilnius, Lithuania.

She later moved from Sweden to Turkey, and was naturalized shortly before the 2011 World Wrestling Championships in Istanbul converting to Islam and taking the Turkish name Elif Jale Yeşilırmak.

Yeşilırmak became silver medalist in the 67 kg division at the Golden Grand Prix held in February 2012 at Klippan, Sweden. She won the bronze medal in the 63 kg division at the 2012 European Wrestling Championships held in Belgrade, Serbia. She became so the second woman wrestler from Turkey to win a medal at the European level after twelve years. She qualified for the 2012 Summer Olympics after winning her matches with rivals from India, Bulgaria, Azerbaijan and France in the 65 kg division at the World Qualification Tournament held in Taiyuan, China.

She won the gold medal in the 67 kg division at the 2013 Mediterranean Games held in Mersin, Turkey. In March 2021, she competed at the European Qualification Tournament in Budapest, Hungary hoping to qualify for the 2020 Summer Olympics in Tokyo, Japan.

References

External links
 

1986 births
Living people
Russian female sport wrestlers
Russian emigrants to Turkey
Naturalized citizens of Turkey
Converts to Islam
Turkish female sport wrestlers
Turkish sportswomen
Turkish people of Russian descent
Olympic wrestlers of Turkey
Wrestlers at the 2012 Summer Olympics
Sportspeople from Smolensk
European Games bronze medalists for Turkey
European Games medalists in wrestling
Wrestlers at the 2015 European Games
World Wrestling Championships medalists
Wrestlers at the 2016 Summer Olympics
Mediterranean Games gold medalists for Turkey
Competitors at the 2013 Mediterranean Games
Competitors at the 2018 Mediterranean Games
Mediterranean Games medalists in wrestling
European Wrestling Championships medalists
21st-century Russian women
21st-century Turkish women